Soldier of Fortune (SOF), subtitled The Journal of Professional Adventurers, is a daily web magazine published by Susan Katz Keating. It began as a monthly U.S. periodical published from 1975 to 2016 as a magazine devoted to worldwide reporting of wars, including conventional warfare, low-intensity warfare, counter-insurgency, and counter-terrorism. It was published by Omega Group Ltd., based in Boulder, Colorado. In May 2022, founder Robert K. Brown announced that the publication had been sold to a longtime contributor, author and security journalist Susan Katz Keating, who grew up around conflict during The Troubles in Northern Ireland.

History
Soldier of Fortune magazine was founded in 1975, by Lieutenant Colonel, U.S. Army Reserve, (Ret.) Robert K. Brown, a Green Beret who served with Special Forces in Vietnam. After retiring from active duty, Brown began publishing a “circular”, magazine-type publication with few pages which contained information on mercenary employment in Oman, where the Sultan Qaboos had recently deposed his father and was battling a communist insurgency. Brown's small circular soon evolved into a glossy, large-format, full-color magazine.

In 1970, Brown co-founded Paladin Press in conjunction with Peder Lund. The company published non-fiction books and videos covering a wide range of specialty topics, including personal and financial freedom, survivalism and preparedness, firearms and shooting, various martial arts and self-defense, military and police tactics, investigation techniques, spying, lockpicking, sabotage, revenge, knives and knife fighting, explosives, and other "action topics". After five years, he left in 1975 to start SOF magazine.

Significant to the early development of SOF was its recruitment of foreign nationals to serve in the Rhodesian Security Forces, during the Rhodesian Bush War (1964–79). During the late 1970s and the 1980s, the success and popularity of a military magazine such as SOF led to the proliferation of like magazines such as Survive, Gung Ho!, New Breed, Eagle, Combat Illustrated, Special Weapons and Tactics, and Combat Ready. SOF was published by the Omega Group Ltd., in Boulder, Colorado. It currently is published by Soldier of Fortune LLC, and is based in Tampa, Florida. At the height of its circulation in the early 1980s the magazine had 190,000 subscribers. The April 2016 issue of Soldier of Fortune was the final print edition; further editions have been published online.

"Gun for Hire" lawsuits

Grievous injury 
During the late 1980s, Soldier of Fortune was sued in civil court several times for having published classified advertisements of services by private mercenaries. In 1987, Norman Norwood, of Arkansas, sued SOF magazine, because of injuries he suffered during a murder attempt by two men hired via a "Gun for Hire" advertisement in the magazine. The US District Court denied the magazine's motion for summary judgment based upon the Constitutional right of free speech under the First Amendment. The Court said, "reasonable jurors could find that the advertisement posed a substantial risk of harm" and that "gun for hire" ads were not the type of speech intended for protection under the First Amendment. In the end, Norwood and Soldier of Fortune magazine settled his lawsuit out of court.

Wrongful death 
In February 1985, John Wayne Hearn, a Vietnam veteran, shot and killed Sandra Black for a $10,000 payment from her husband, Robert Black. Black communicated with Hearn through a classified advertisement published in Soldier of Fortune, wherein Hearn solicited "high-risk assignments. U.S. or overseas". In 1989, Sandra Black's son Gary and her mother Marjorie Eimann filed a wrongful-death lawsuit against SOF magazine and its parent publishing company Omega Group Ltd., seeking $21 million in redress of their grievance.

The jury found Soldier of Fortune grossly negligent in publishing Hearn's classified ad for implicit illegal activity (murder) and awarded the plaintiffs $9.5 million in damages. However, in 1990 the United States Court of Appeals for the Fifth Circuit reversed the verdict, saying that the standard of conduct imposed upon the magazine was too high, because the advertisement was ambiguously worded.

Contract killing 
In 1989, four men were convicted of conspiracy to commit murder in the 1985 contract killing of Richard Braun, of Atlanta, Georgia. The killers were hired through a classified services advertisement published in SOF magazine that read: "GUN FOR HIRE".  Braun's sons filed a civil lawsuit against the magazine and a jury found in their favor, awarding them $12.37 million in damages, which the judge later reduced to $4.37 million. Nonetheless, in 1992 the United States Court of Appeals for the Eleventh Circuit upheld the judgement of the jury, saying "the publisher could recognize the offer of criminal activity as readily as its readers, obviously, did". The Brauns and SOF magazine settled the wrongful-death lawsuit for $200,000. One consequence of the lost lawsuits was that the magazine suspended publication of classified advertisements for mercenary or related work, either in the U.S. or overseas.

Editors
 Jim Graves, former managing editor and columnist.

 Susan Katz Keating, editor and publisher (as of March 30, 2022).

Notable contributors
 Col. David "Hack" Hackworth, US Army (ret./deceased)
 Ltc. Robert C. MacKenzie, US Army (ret./deceased)
 Ltc. Oliver North, US Marine Corps (ret.)
 Dale Dye, US Marine Corps (ret.)
 Al J Venter
 Michael Echanis (1950–1978), Vietnam veteran, Purple Heart recipient – martial-arts editor
 John Plaster, US Army (ret.)

See also
Soldier of Fortune (video game)

References

Further reading
 Lamy, Philip. "Millennialism in the Mass Media: The Case of 'Soldier of Fortune' Magazine." Journal for the Scientific Study of Religion, Vol. 31, No. 4, December 1992, pp. 408-424. . .

External links
 

Defunct magazines published in the United States
1975 establishments in Colorado
Magazines established in 1975
Magazines disestablished in 2016
Magazines published in Colorado
Mass media in Boulder, Colorado
Military magazines published in the United States
Monthly magazines published in the United States
Online magazines published in the United States
Online magazines with defunct print editions